Martin Scott may refer to:

 Martin Scott (politician), representative of District 2 to the Georgia House of Representatives
 Martin Scott (cricketer) (born 1943), cricketer
 Martin Scott (English footballer) (born 1968), played for Rotherham United, Bristol City and Sunderland, former manager of Hartlepool United F.C.
 Martin Scott (Scottish footballer) (born 1986), played for Hibernian, Ross County and Livingston
 Martin Scott (military officer), signatory of the Treaty of St. Peters
 Martin Scott (writer), pseudonym of Martin Millar, author of the Thraxas fantasy series
 Martin Scott (FDNY Commissioner) (1898–1979), Fire Commissioner of the City of New York
 Martin J. Scott (1865–1954), American priest